The United Nations Economic Commission for Latin America and the Caribbean, known as ECLAC, UNECLAC or in Spanish and Portuguese CEPAL, is a United Nations regional commission to encourage economic cooperation. ECLAC includes 46 member States (20 in Latin America, 13 in the Caribbean and 13 from outside the region), and 14 associate members which are various non-independent territories, associated island countries and a commonwealth in the Caribbean. ECLAC publishes statistics covering the countries of the region and makes cooperative agreements with nonprofit institutions. The headquarters of ECLAC is in Santiago, Chile.
 
ECLAC was established in 1948 as the UN Economic Commission for Latin America, or UNECLA. In 1984, a resolution was passed to include the countries of the Caribbean in the name.  It reports to the UN Economic and Social Council (ECOSOC).

Member States
The following are all member States of ECLAC:

Associate Members 
The following are all associate members of ECLAC:

Locations

 Santiago, Chile (headquarters) 
 Mexico City, Mexico (Central American subregional headquarters)
 Port of Spain, Trinidad and Tobago (Caribbean subregional headquarters)
 Buenos Aires, Argentina (country office)
 Brasília, Brazil (country office)
 Montevideo, Uruguay (country office)
 Bogotá, Colombia (country office)
 Washington, DC, United States of America (liaison office)

Executive Secretaries

In relation to development discourse and dependency theory 
The formation of the United Nations Economic Commission for Latin America was crucial to the beginning of "Big D development". Many economic scholars attribute the founding of ECLA and its policy implementation in Latin America for the subsequent debates on structuralism and dependency theory. Although forming in the post-war period, the historic roots of ECLA trace back to political movement made long before the war had begun.

Before World War II, the perception of economic development in Latin America was formulated primarily from colonial ideology. This perception, combined with the Monroe Doctrine that asserted the United States as the only foreign power that could intervene in Latin American affairs, led to substantial resentment in Latin America. In the eyes of those living in the continent, Latin America was considerably economically strong; most had livable wages and industry was relatively dynamic. This concern of a need for economic restructuring was taken up by the League of Nations and manifested in a document drawn up by Stanley Bruce and presented to the League in 1939. This in turn strongly influenced the creation of the United Nations Economic and Social Committee in 1944. Although it was a largely ineffective policy development initially, the formation of ECLA proved to have profound effects in Latin America in following decades. For example, by 1955, Peru was receiving $28.5 million in loans per ECLA request. Most of these loans were utilized as means to finance foreign exchange costs, creating more jobs and heightening export trade. To investigate the extent to which this aid was supporting industrial development plans in Peru, ECLA was sent in to study its economic structure. In order to maintain stronghold over future developmental initiatives, ECLA and its branches continued providing financial support to Peru to assist in the country's general development.

The terms of trade at this time, set by the United States, introduced the concept of "unequal exchange" in that the so-called "North" mandated prices that allowed them a greater return on its own resources than that of the "South's". Thus, although the export sector had grown during this time, certain significant economic and social issues continued to threaten this period of so-called stability. Although real income was on the rise, its distribution was still very uneven. Social problems were still overwhelmingly prevalent; large portions of the population were unnourished and without homes, and the education and health system were inept.

See also
 Library of the Economic Commission for Latin America and the Caribbean
 United Nations System
 eLAC eLAC2007, eLAC2010 and eLAC2015: Strategies for the Information Society in Latin America and the Caribbean
 Association of Caribbean States
 Community of Latin American and Caribbean States

References

Bibliography
 Paul Berthoud, A Professional Life Narrative, 2008, worked with CEPAL-ECLAC and offers testimony from the inside of the early years of the organization.

External links

 UN Economic Commission for Latin America and the Caribbean official site

United Nations Development Group
Economic Commission for Latin America and the Caribbean
Organizations established in 1948
Economy of the Caribbean
Development economics
Organisations based in Santiago
Latin America and the Caribbean